Peder Puck (24 September 1892 – 10 January 1989) was a Norwegian footballer. He played in one match for the Norway national football team in 1917.

References

External links
 

1892 births
1989 deaths
Norwegian footballers
Norway international footballers
Place of birth missing
Association footballers not categorized by position